This is a list of named geological features, of various kinds, on asteroid 4 Vesta.

Catenae

Craters

Dorsa

Fossae

Planitiae

Rupes

Terrae

Tholi

References

Vesta